Trichromia cybar is a moth in the family Erebidae. It was described by William Schaus in 1924. It is found in Argentina.

References

Moths described in 1924
cybar